The 2012–13 Nashville Predators season was the team's 15th season in the National Hockey League (NHL). The regular season was reduced from its usual 82 games to 48 due to the 2012–13 NHL lockout.

Off-season
After already losing one half of their All-Star defensive core to free agency when Ryan Suter signed with the Minnesota Wild, on July 19, 2012, Shea Weber signed an offer sheet from the Philadelphia Flyers. The Predators had seven days to decide whether to match the offer, opting to do so on July 24 to keep Weber in a Predators uniform.

Regular season
The Predators scored 109 goals (excluding three shootout-winning goals) over the lockout-shortened season of 48 games, tied for 30th overall with the Florida Panthers. The Predators were also shut out a league-high nine times, tied with the Phoenix Coyotes.

Standings

Game log

Playoffs
For the first time since the 2008-09 season, the Predators missed the playoffs.

Player stats
Final stats
Skaters

Goaltenders

†Denotes player spent time with another team before joining the Predators. Stats reflect time with the Predators only.
‡Traded mid-season
Bold/italics denotes franchise record

Awards and records

Transactions 

The Predators have been involved in the following transactions during the 2012–13 season.

Trades

Free agents signed

Free agents lost

Claimed via waivers

Lost via waivers

Player signings

Draft picks 

Nashville's picks at the 2012 NHL Entry Draft in Pittsburgh, Pennsylvania.

See also 
2012–13 NHL season

References

Nashville Predators seasons
N
N
Nashville Predators
Nashville Predators